Yuliya Petrovna Gavrilova (born 20 July 1989) is a Russian sabre fencer. She won two medals (gold in the team event and bronze in the individual), as a member of the Russian team, in sabre at the 2011 World Fencing Championships in Catania, Italy.

Career 
She began fencing in 1999, when a fencing coach came to her school, looking for children who wanted to try fencing.

Gavrilova represented Russia at the 2012 Summer Olympics in London, where she competed in the women's individual sabre event, along with her teammate Sofiya Velikaya, who eventually won a silver medal in the final. She defeated Kazakhstan's Yuliya Zhivitsa in the first preliminary round, before losing out her next match to China's Zhu Min, with a final score of 11–15.

At the 2016 Summer Olympics, she was part of the Russian team that won gold in the women's team sabre event.

References

External links 

 
  (archive)
 
 
 
 

1989 births
Living people
Russian female sabre fencers
Olympic fencers of Russia
Fencers at the 2012 Summer Olympics
Sportspeople from Novosibirsk
Fencers at the 2016 Summer Olympics
Olympic gold medalists for Russia
Olympic medalists in fencing
Medalists at the 2016 Summer Olympics
Universiade medalists in fencing
Universiade bronze medalists for Russia
Medalists at the 2013 Summer Universiade
21st-century Russian women